The Jewish News, formerly The Detroit Jewish News, is a weekly community newspaper serving the Jewish community of Metro Detroit in Michigan. Jewish Renaissance Media publishes the newspaper. The publication's headquarters are in Southfield.

History
The Jewish News of Detroit, Michigan, bills itself as "the largest, most comprehensive Jewish newspaper in North America." The newspaper was founded in 1942. In 1951 the newspaper absorbed an older newspaper, the Detroit Jewish Chronicle & The Legal Chronicle, which was established in 1916. In the 1980s it was purchased by Charles "Chuck" Buerger, the owner of the Baltimore Jewish Times.  Buerger expanded the scope and the size of the paper, and it regularly exceeded 200 pages.  Buerger died in 1996, and the paper was taken over by his son Andrew. In 2000 Andrew Buerger sold it, along with The Atlanta Jewish Times, to Jewish Renaissance Media, which also operates the website Jewish.com.  In 2005 the newspaper claimed an "adult readership of more than 40,000 every week". In 2005 the newspaper won a number of Michigan Press Association awards, including first place for Design, Editorial Writing, Local Columnist, and Special Section, and first and second place for Feature Story. , Arthur M. Horwitz was the publisher and executive editor, and Jackie Headapohl was the managing editor of The Detroit Jewish News and Red Thread magazine insert.
In 2020 the newspaper became a nonprofit news organization.

The Detroit Jewish News Foundation

In 2011, The Detroit Jewish News Foundation was created to digitally archive over 100 years of news involving Detroit's Jewish Community. Through its William Davidson Digital Archive of Jewish Detroit History, is the Michigan Jewish community’s indispensable source of primary information that educates, illuminates and makes relevant the community’s past, strengthens its present and shapes its future. The foundation fortifies links to family and community by providing visitors to the William Davidson Digital Archive of Jewish Detroit History a first-class, innovative, enjoyable multi-media experience. The backbone of the William Davidson Digital Archive of Jewish Detroit History is the entire contents of The Detroit Jewish News (1942–present) and The Detroit Jewish Chronicle (1916-1951). Collectively, they span approximately 100 consecutive years of community and family history. The Detroit Jewish News Foundation is an independent 501 (c)(3) non-profit organization. It was formed in 2011 to pursue an educational, cultural and scholarly mission focusing on illuminating the ongoing story of the Detroit area Jewish community and its families. In support of this mission, the foundation digitized and made available the entire contents of The Detroit Jewish News in November 2013. It digitized and made available the entire contents of The Detroit Jewish Chronicle in October 2015.

See also

 History of the Jews in Metro Detroit

Notes

External links
The Jewish News website
American Jewish Press Association Member Profile
The Detroit Jewish News Foundation

Jewish newspapers published in the United States
Jews and Judaism in Detroit
Newspapers published in Detroit
Newspapers established in 1942
Weekly newspapers published in the United States
1942 establishments in Michigan